Humphrey J. Maris is a physicist and a professor at Brown University. He studies cryogenics.  In 1991 he was made the George Chase Professor of Natural Science. He has led experiments into the nature of the quantum state of the electron. Awarded the 2011 Fritz London Memorial Prize by the International Union of Pure and Applied Physics.

References 

Year of birth missing (living people)
Living people
Brown University faculty
English physicists